The shooting competitions at the 1996 Summer Olympics took place at the Wolf Creek Shooting Complex near Atlanta, United States. Competitions were held in men's events and women's events. For men's and women's double trap, it was the first Olympic competition, a women's shotgun event also had been added.

In addition, the number of targets in trap and skeet had been reduced from 200 to 125, and the final rules for all events were changed so that any post-final ties would be broken by shoot-offs, as opposed to the previous rule that preferred the shooter with worse qualification score and better final score.

Medal summary

Medal table

Men's events

Women's events

Participating nations
A total of 419 shooters, 294 men and 125 women, from 100 nations competed at the Atlanta Games:

References

External links

 
1996 Summer Olympics events
1996
Olympics
Shooting competitions in the United States